Karlo Bašić (15 September 1911 – 25 May 2000) was a Croatian sailor. He competed in the Star event at the 1952 Summer Olympics.

References

External links
 

1911 births
2000 deaths
Croatian male sailors (sport)
Olympic sailors of Yugoslavia
Sailors at the 1952 Summer Olympics – Star
People from Mali Lošinj